Cafrune  may refer to:
 Jorge Cafrune, Argentine singer
Cafrune (album), a 1962 album by Jorge Cafrune
 Yamila Cafrune, Argentine folk music singer, daughter of Jorge Cafrune